Jelenia Gora Voivodeship was a unit of administrative division and local government in Poland in the years 1975–1998, superseded by the Lower Silesian Voivodeship. Its capital city was Jelenia Gora.

Major cities and towns (population in 1995)
 Jelenia Góra (93,500)
 Bolesławiec (44,400)
 Zgorzelec (36,800)
 Lubań (24,400)
 Kamienna Góra (23,600)

See also
 Voivodeships of Poland

Former voivodeships of Poland (1975–1998)